Advertising slogans are short phrases used in advertising campaigns to generate publicity and unify a company's marketing strategy. The phrases may be used to attract attention to a distinctive product feature or reinforce a company's brand.

Etymology and nomenclature
According to the 1913 Webster's Dictionary, a slogan derives from the Gaelic "sluagh-ghairm" (an army cry). Its contemporary definition denotes a distinctive advertising motto or advertising phrase used by any entity to convey a purpose or ideal. This is also known as a catchphrase. Taglines, or tags, are American terms describing brief public communications to promote certain products and services. In the UK, they are called end lines or straplines.

Format 
Most corporate advertisements are short, memorable phrases, often between 3 and 5 words. Slogans adopt different tones to convey different meanings. For example, funny slogans can enliven conversation and increase memorability. Slogans often unify diverse corporate advertising pieces across different mediums. Slogans may be accompanied by logos, brand names, or musical jingles.

History 

Beecham's Pills' "Beechams Pills: Worth a guinea a Box" from August 1859, is considered to be the world's first advertising slogan.

Use 
Some slogans are created for long term corporate identity process, while others are interested for specific limited-time campaigns. However, since some ideas resonate with the public with persistence, many advertising slogans retain their influence even after general use is discontinued. If an advertising slogan enters into the public vernacular, word-of-mouth communication may increase consumer awareness of the product and extend an ad campaign's lifespan, or cause a company to adopt it for long term advertising and identity.

Slogans that associate emotional responses or evoke recollections of memories increase their likelihood to be adopted by the public and shared. Additionally, by linking a slogan to a commonplace discussion topic (e.g. stress, food, traffic), consumers will recall the slogan more often and associate the corporation with their personal experiences.

If a slogan is adopted by the public, it can have a notable influence in everyday social interaction. Slogans can serve as connection points between community members as individuals share pithy taglines in conversation. In contrast, if an individual is unaware of a popular slogan or tagline, they can be socially excluded from conversation and disengage from the discussion.

Social control
Advertising slogans as a system of social control include devices similar to watchwords, catchwords, and mottoes.  The use of slogans may be examined insofar as the slogans elicit unconscious and unintentional responses.

The ongoing argument 
Quantifying the effects of an effective, or ineffective, ad campaign can prove challenging to scholars. Critics argue taglines are a self-gratifying, unnecessary form of corporate branding that is neither memorable nor pithy.  However, proponents argue if taglines enter everyday public discourse, the company's market influence could exponentially increase.

Functional slogans

A marketing slogan can play a part in the interplay between rival companies. A functional slogan usually:
 states product benefits (or brand benefits) for users (or potential buyer)
 implies a distinction between it and other firms' products—with constraints
 makes a simple, concise, clearly defined, and appropriate statement
 is either witty, or has distinct "personality"
 gives a credible impression of a brand or product
 makes the consumer experience an emotion; Or, creates a need or desire 
 is hard to forget—it adheres to one's memory

The business sloganeering process communicates the value of a product or service to customers, for the purpose of selling the product or service. It is a business function for attracting customers.

See also
Advertising (Consumerism)
Consumer confusion
Impulse buying (Impulse)
List of slogans
Media manipulation
Political slogan
Promotion (marketing)
Tagline
Visual marketing

Notes

References

Further reading

External articles
 
 The Advertising Slogan Hall of Fame, www.adslogans.co.uk 
 Advertising Industry Guidelines 2014
 Advertising Slogans 

 
Promotion and marketing communications
Advertising techniques
Advertising campaigns
Marketing techniques